Madison Avenue Methodist Episcopal Church, now known as Douglas Memorial Community Church, is a historic Methodist Episcopal church located at Baltimore, Maryland, United States. It is a brick, Greek Revival, temple-fronted structure featuring four fluted Corinthian columns and built 1857–1858.  The rear addition is a two-story Colonial Revival style wing dating from about 1900.

Madison Avenue Methodist Episcopal Church was listed on the National Register of Historic Places in 1992.

Pastors at Douglas Memorial Community Church include Marion C. Bascom and Raphael Warnock.

References

External links
, including photo from 1991, at Maryland Historical Trust
Douglas Memorial Community Church website

1857 establishments in Maryland
African-American history in Baltimore
Central Baltimore
Churches in Baltimore
Properties of religious function on the National Register of Historic Places in Baltimore
Greek Revival church buildings in Maryland
Churches completed in 1857
19th-century Methodist church buildings in the United States
Methodist churches in Maryland
Churches on the National Register of Historic Places in Maryland
Baltimore City Landmarks